Charles Esmond Parkinson (born 3 October 1886) was a rugby union player who represented Australia. Parkinson, a wing, was born in Colinton, Queensland and claimed one international rugby cap for Australia.

References

                   

Australian rugby union players
Australia international rugby union players
1886 births
Year of death missing
Rugby union players from Queensland
Rugby union wings